Liam Stephen Cary (born August 21, 1947) is an American prelate of the Roman Catholic Church.  He has served as bishop of the Diocese of Baker in Oregon since 2012.

Biography

Early life and education 
Liam Cary was born on August 21, 1947, in Portland, Oregon.  Three years later the family moved to Prineville, Oregon.  Liam Cary studied for the priesthood at Mount Angel Seminary in St. Benedict, Oregon and St. Patrick's Seminary in Menlo Park, California.  Cary then entered Pontifical North American College in Rome.  He received a Bachelor of Sacred Theology degree and a Licentiate in Sacred Theology from the Pontifical Gregorian University in Rome. In 1970, he took a leave of absence from St. Patrick's seminary, returning to his studies 18 years later.

Priesthood 
Cary was ordained a priest for the Archdiocese of Portland by Archbishop William Levada on September 5, 1992.After his ordination  Cary served as the parochial vicar at St. Joseph Parish in Salem, Oregon (1992–1995), archdiocesan vocation director (1995–1999) and pastor at Sacred Heart Parish Medford, Oregon, St. Luke's in Woodburn, Oregon (1999–2011) and St. Mary's Parish in Eugene, Oregon (2011–2012).

Bishop of Baker 
Cary was named the bishop of the Diocese of Baker by Pope Benedict XVI on March 8, 2012.  His episcopal consecration took place on May 18, 2012, at the hands of  Archbishop John Vlazny.  Bishops Robert F. Vasa and William Skylstad were the co-consecrators.

See also

 Catholic Church hierarchy
 Catholic Church in the United States
 Historical list of the Catholic bishops of the United States
 List of Catholic bishops of the United States
 Lists of patriarchs, archbishops, and bishops

References

External links

Roman Catholic Diocese of Baker Official Site

Episcopal succession

 

1947 births
Living people
Clergy from Portland, Oregon
Pontifical North American College alumni
Pontifical Gregorian University alumni
Roman Catholic Archdiocese of Portland in Oregon
21st-century Roman Catholic bishops in the United States
Roman Catholic bishops of Baker
People from Prineville, Oregon
Mount Angel Seminary